Seelamsetty Venkata Sri Rama Rao (1913–1970) was an art director, motion picture director and producer of Telugu films. He was one of the debutant technicians in the film industry, right from the era of non-talkies to the talkies of the late 1970s. He was the only art director who had designed the art work for the movie on the Lord Venkateswara by the title Sri Venkateswara Mahatyam (directed by P. Pullaiah under the banner Padmasri Pictures in 1959-1960). He belongs to the Kapu-Telaga Community of Andhra Pradesh. His children are son late Arvind Prakash, Mechanical Engineer and two daughters Devi Chandra and late Sathyavathi. His Grandchildren of Late. Arvind Prakash are Kumar, Kishore and Prasad. And Grandchildren of Devi Chandra are Poonam Kiran and Thrivikram Suman.  Whereas since his last daughter late Satyavathi has expired in month of July dated 9the of 2000.

Career
He has worked as an art director in both Telugu and Tamil languages around 450 movies for various banners like Vahini Studios, Raagini and Vijaya Productions. He was closely associated with the Producer/Director named Ghantasala Balaramayya and the Music Director, Master Venu.

He also produced movies under his own banner called "Jaimini Productions", viz. Santha Balanagamma, Chinnamma Katha starring Siva Rao,  Vengal Reddy and Krishna Kumari.

He won distinguished award for his artistry work, painting on the folk ladies named Lambadi kanya from the British Government in the year 1934. His well-known art directed movies in Telugu and Tamil are Sri Venkateswara Mahatyam (In which his painting of "Lord Venkateswara" is still in Salarjung Museum, Hyderabad. It was said that he was the only person who was allowed to portrait the Lord at Tirumala Tirupathi Devasthanam).

Filmography

 Mallapilla (1938)
 Santha Bala Nagamma (1942)
 Mugguru Marateelu (1946)
 Balaraju (1948)
 Dharmadevata (1952)
 Chinnamma Katha (1952)
 Sarangadhara (1957)
 Vinayaka Chavithi (1957)
 Deepavali (1960)
 Sri Venkateswara Mahatyam (1960)
 Vanagamuddi (Tamil)

External links
 

1913 births
1970 deaths
Indian art directors
Telugu film producers
Film producers from Andhra Pradesh